Tenirberdi Suiunbaev (born 5 September 1994) is a Kyrgyzstani middle-distance runner. He competed in the 800 metres event at the 2014 IAAF World Indoor Championships.

References

1994 births
Living people
Kyrgyzstani male middle-distance runners
Place of birth missing (living people)